Ardahan Province is a province in the north-east of Turkey, bordering Georgia and Armenia. The provincial capital is the city of Ardahan.

Demographics 
With 94,932 inhabitants in 2021, Ardahan was the third least populated city after Bayburt and Tunceli in Turkey. Ardahan Province is populated by Azerbaijanis, Kurds and Turks. However, the area was heterogeneous prior to World War I and the Armenian genocide.

Slavs constituted  of the population.

In the first Turkish census taking place in 1927, Ardahan District had a population of 88,989 of which  spoke Turkish as first language, while  spoke Kurdish.  of the Kurdish-speaking population lived in Göle sub-district. In the same census,  of the population was Muslim. 14 Christians lived in the district. The district had a population of 104,911 in 1935.

History 
The first surviving record about this region is attributed to Strabo, who calls it Gogarene (Gugark) and mentions that it was a part of the Armenia, taken away from the Kingdom of Iberia. In the Middle Ages Ardahan served as an important transit point for goods arriving from the Abbasid Caliphate and departing to the regions around the Black Sea. During the 8th to 10th centuries the region was in hands of the Bagrationi princes of Tao-Klarjeti, and later part of Kingdom of Georgia between 11th to 15th centuries. It was a theatre of war during the Byzantine-Georgian wars. According to the Arab historian Yahya of Antioch, the Byzantines razed Ardahan and slaughtered its population in 1021. The Mongols took hold of the region in the 1230s but the Georgian princes of Samtskhe were able to recapture it in 1266. As a result of Peace of Amasya, signed in 1555, Ardahan passed to Ottoman hands and reorganized into the Ardahan sanjak as part of eyalet of Childir. In 1578 Ottomans appointed the former Georgian prince, Manuchar (who took the name of Mustafa after converting to Islam) as the first governor. From 1625 onwards the entire eyalet was a hereditary possession of the now-Muslim atabegs of Samtskhe, which administered it as hereditary governors, with some exceptions, until the mid-18th century.

In 1878, after the Russo-Turkish War (1877–1878), the region was incorporated into the Russian Empire, and until 1918 was known as Kars Oblast. Northern part of the province is Democratic Republic of Georgia from 1918 to 1921 and southern part of the province is Democratic Republic of Armenia from 1918 to 1920, Ardahan was reclaimed by Turkey under the Treaty of Kars in 1921.

The construction of the Baku–Tbilisi–Ceyhan pipeline gave the local economy a brief boost from 2000 onwards.

Geography 
Ardahan province is located in the far north east of Turkey, where the eastern extremity of the high plateau of Eastern Anatolia converges with the Lesser Caucasus mountain range. It is consequently an area of very high altitude and severe winters. This is attractive open countryside which however spends many months of the year under snow. At this altitude temperatures on average reach  and can drop below freezing all year round, including summer months.

The local economy depends on farming and raising livestock. Until 1993 Ardahan was a district of the province of Kars, becoming a province in its own right has meant more investment in infrastructure

There are two crossing points into the Samtskhe–Javakheti district of Georgia, one at Posof and the other (currently closed) at Çıldır. The Turkish military have a strong presence in this border district, another boost to the local economy.

Climate 
The predominant climate in the Ardahan province is humid continental climate (Köppen climate classification Dfb) bordering on a subarctic climate (Dfc), with most large settlements in the province being located in lowest possible elevation areas, in attempt to avoid the year-round cold temperatures, thus staying just below the subarctic limit. Smaller locales, districts, villages and a significant portion of the landscape, exhibits a true subarctic climate (Dfc), being the second most widespread climate in the region.

Districts 

Ardahan province is divided into 6 districts (capital district in bold):
 Ardahan
 Çıldır
 Damal
 Göle
 Hanak
 Posof

Cities and towns 
Ardahan City 17,171 inh.
Göle City 6,231 inh.
Hanak City 4,030 inh.
Damal City 3,804 inh.
Köprülü Town 2,126 inh.
Posof City 1,810 inh.
Çıldır City 1,502 inh.

Places of interest 
 There are a number of medieval castles in the district including Şeytan Castle.
 Lake Çıldır
 Phantom of Atatürk in city of Damal

There is a unique natural incident, between mid of June and mid July during sunset, depending on angles of the sunrays. An image resembling the silhouette of Atatürk's face can be seen as a shadow on the hillside. It was first seen by a shepherd who was with his herd over the hill.

See also 
List of populated places in Ardahan Province

Bibliography

References 

 
Provinces of Turkey
Tao-Klarjeti
States and territories established in 1921